Reddigudem mandal is one of the 20 mandals in the NTR district of the Indian state of Andhra Pradesh.

Villages 
Anneraopeta                                         
Kudapa 
Kunaparajuparva
Maddulaparva
Mutchinapalle
Naguluru   
Narukullapadu             
Patha Naguluru 
Rangapuram
Reddigudem
Raghavapuram
Rudravaram
Seetharampuram

References 

Mandals in NTR district